Holywood railway station serves Holywood in County Down, Northern Ireland.

History
The Belfast and County Down Railway (B&CDR) opened the line between Queen's Quay, Belfast and Holywood on 2 August 1848. Holywood was a terminus until May 1865, when the Belfast, Holywood and Bangor Railway (BH&BR) opened from Holywood to Bangor. In 1859 the B&CDR sold its Holywood branch to the BH&BR, with the result that Holywood station came under BH&BR management. However, the B&CDR leased the BH&BR line from 1878 and took it over in 1884, which meant that Holywood station returned to its original management and ownership.

When BH&BR opened in 1865 it was single track. In response to increased traffic the B&CDR doubled the track in stages between 1897 and 1902. In 1911 Holywood station handled passenger and parcel traffic, while its goods yard offered facilities for goods, general livestock, horses and prize cattle. Carriages could be conveyed by passenger train.

The Ulster Transport Authority withdrew Holywood's goods services on 24/04/1950. Translink had the station refurbished in 2008.

Service
More frequent trains run at peak times, and the service reduces to hourly in the evenings.

Some peak-hour services run only as far as Belfast Central, or pass through Holywood without stopping.

On Sundays there is an hourly service in each direction.

References

Sources

External links

Railway stations in County Down
Railway stations opened in 1848
Railway stations served by NI Railways
Holywood, County Down
Railway stations in Northern Ireland opened in 1848